The CCF Display and Information System (CDIS) is a computer-based system that provides airport and flight information to air traffic controllers formerly based at the London Terminal Control Centre in England. It was designed by Praxis in 1992.

Notes and references

Air traffic control in the United Kingdom
Computer-related introductions in 1992
History of air traffic control
Information systems